Jet Carrier is a 1954 American short documentary film produced by Otto Lang as a CinemaScope Special. It was nominated for two Academy Awards - one for Best Documentary Short, and the other for Best Two-Reel Short. It was filmed aboard the aircraft carrier USS Yorktown.

References

External links

1954 films
1954 short films
1954 documentary films
American short documentary films
Documentary films about military aviation
20th Century Fox short films
1950s short documentary films
1950s English-language films
1950s American films